Live at the Studio Grill is a live album by jazz pianist Freddie Redd recorded in Hollywood in 1988 and released on the Triloka label in 1990.

Reception 

The Allmusic review by Scott Yanow states: "Due to his timeless style and relatively few recordings, Freddie Redd is a legend. A fine bop pianist who was an associate of his idols Bud Powell and Thelonious Monk, Redd (62 at the time of this set) will probably always be best-known for his work on the play The Connection. Although maintaining a low profile, Redd had been playing continuously through the decades ... Redd is an unrecognized giant. Bassist Al McKibbon and drummer Billy Higgins offer short solos and sympathetic support on this highly recommended trio set".

Track listing 
All compositions by Freddie Redd, except where indicated
 "I'm Gonna Be Happy" – 7:09
 "I'll Remember April" (Gene de Paul, Patricia Johnston, Don Raye) – 8:09	
 "I'll Keep Loving You" (Bud Powell) – 4:37
 "Don't Lose the Blues" – 5:53
 "'Round Midnight" (Thelonious Monk, Cootie Williams, Bernie Hanighen) – 6:28
 "Waltzin' In" – 6:53
 "For Heaven's Sake" (Elise Bretton, Sherman Edwards, Donald Meyer) – 4:10
 "All the Things You Are" (Jerome Kern, Oscar Hammerstein II) – 9:24

Personnel 
Freddie Redd – piano
Al McKibbon – bass
Billy Higgins – drums

References 

1990 live albums
Freddie Redd albums